The Association Nationale des Guides de Centrafrique (ANGC, National Guide Association of the Central African Republic) is the national Guiding organization of the Central African Republic. As of 2017 there were 9,298 members. Founded under French Equatorial Africa in 1952, the girls-only organization became a full member of the World Association of Girl Guides and Girl Scouts in 1963.

See also

 Fédération du scoutisme centrafricain

References

World Association of Girl Guides and Girl Scouts member organizations
Scouting and Guiding in the Central African Republic
Youth organizations established in 1952
1952 establishments in the French colonial empire